Aaj Ki Raat Hai Zindagi ( Today's Night is the Life) is an Indian entertainment talk show which premiered on 18 October 2015 and was broadcast on STAR Plus. The series revolved around common people who have accomplished something extraordinary. Every episode of the show featured Bollywood celebrities, who were invited by the host of the show. The series was hosted by Amitabh Bachchan. Due to low TRPs, the series was last aired on 10 January 2016.

Development began in September 2015, when Uday Shankar, CEO of STAR Plus, announced his plan to make an Indian version of the British TV series Tonight's the Night. The series received average reviews; one critic said, "Bachchan's show has a good concept but bad packaging", while another said "The concept is beautiful and Amitabh Bachchan is fabulous".

Format
Aaj Ki Raat Hai Zindagi presented the journey of people, who, against all odds, helped improve society and were an inspiration for others to change their outlook. The host invited Bollywood celebrities to give a gift to everyday heroes who had helped others. The series brought forth and celebrated unsung heroes who were selfless in their endeavors, who were then given a gift by the invited celebrity.

Guests
Guests on the show included Dharmendra, Sunny Deol, Shilpa Shetty, Mohit Chauhan, Parineeti Chopra, Alia Bhatt, Maryam Siddiqui and Kapil Sharma. Popular television actress Sanaya Irani also made an appearance.

Development and production
In September 2015, Uday Shankar, CEO of STAR Plus, had the idea to create an Indian version of the British TV series Tonight's the Night. The series was titled as Aaj Ki Raat Hai Zindagi and was aimed to showcase common people who had accomplished something extraordinary. Shankar invited Amitabh Bachchan to host Aaj Ki Raat Hai Zindagi; he accepted. Bachchan said, "I got an invitation from the channel to do this show and I liked it." Shankar said that Aaj Ki Raat Hai Zindagi will "not only entertain but also inspire individuals and leave them with a reason to smile". Having collaborated with Bachchan on Kaun Banega Crorepati, Shankar said, "We have once again collaborated with the biggest superstar of the country Amitabh Bachchan for a unique project on Indian television." In October 2015, Hussain Kuwajerwala was finalized to co-host the series along with Bachchan. He said, "It was my birthday on Monday and on Tuesday, I started shooting with him. There couldn’t have been a better birthday gift for me."

Before the premiere of the series, Bachchan was nervous wondering how the audience would react to the show. He said, "[...] the apprehensions of its receiving or rejection are foremost in the mind."

The series premiered on 18 October 2015, on STAR Plus, and was broadcast on Sundays. Every episode featured leading Bollywood celebrities who were invited to gift something to everyday heroes who have helped others in some way. Alia Bhatt and Shilpa Shetty were the first guests to appear on the show. Being a finite series, it aired its last episode on 10 January 2016 due to low TRPs with a total of 13 episodes. A source told Mid-Day said, "The channel had great expectations from the show [...] However, the plummeting TRPs prove that it has not been able to engage the audience."

Reception
Aaj Ki Raat Hai Zindagi earned average reviews from critics. Shruti Kapoor of India Today in her review called the series "quite different from Tonight's the Night". She said, "Bachchan's show has a good concept but bad packaging." However, she praised Bachchan's hosting and said, "The only saving grace of the show is Big B himself." Tista Sengupta of Rediff.com in her review, called the series "Inspiring but not so impressive". In addition, she said, "The concept is beautiful and Amitabh Bachchan is fabulous. But Aaj Ki Raat Hai Zindagi still doesn't get it right." Rajyasree Sen of Live Mint in her review said, "This is not high entertainment from any angle, but it’s a show worth watching simply because it’s such a pleasant change to hear happy and inspiring real-life stories about people making a difference. " She encouraged readers to tune in and watch it.

References

External links
 Aaj Ki Raat Hai Zindagi streaming on Hotstar
 

2015 Indian television series debuts
Hindi-language television shows
Television shows set in Mumbai
StarPlus original programming
2016 Indian television series endings
Indian television series based on British television series